Haunted Forest is a 2007 American Horror film directed by Mauro Borrelli and starring Sevy Di Cione, Adam Green and Kiralee Hayashi. The film premiered at the Oxford International Film Festival on April 6, 2007. Shot entirely in California and Nevada, it is produced by Fotocomics Productions and released in the U.S. by Lionsgate.

Plot 
Driven by his grandfather's mysterious past, Sean (Sevy Di Cione) searches for the key to a man's sudden disappearance within a dark forest. He believes it may have a connection to an enigmatic tree that now haunts his dreams. Sean's friends (Adam Green and Edoardo Beghi), along with two young women, accompany him on his quest. Things soon turn deadly as Satinka, a beautiful and vengeful spirit, wreaks her revenge for an unspeakable crime committed over 200 years ago. This hurls the group into a foreboding ecological nightmare, on a road straight to Hell.

Cast 
Sevy Di Cione as Sean/Nodin
Adam Green as Josh
Mark Hengst as McCane
Edoardo Beghi as Flipp
Naomi Ueno as Kiyomi
Jennifer Luree as Jennifer
Hans Uder as Tourist
Kiralee Hayashi as Satinka

References

External links
 

American supernatural horror films
2007 horror films
2007 films
Supernatural slasher films
2000s English-language films
Films directed by Mauro Borrelli
2000s American films